Mine warfare refers to the use of different types of explosive devices:
Land mine, a weight-triggered explosive device intended to maim or kill people or to  disable or destroy vehicles
Minelaying, deployment of explosive mines at sea
Naval mine, a self-contained explosive device placed in water to destroy ships or submarines
Mining (military), the use of tunnels and sometimes large amounts of explosives to bring down fortifications

See also
 Minesweeper (disambiguation)
 Minehunter
 Minelayer